Postbauer-Heng station is a railway station serving the municipality of Postbauer-Heng situated in the German district of Neumarkt. It is situated at km 73.5 of the Nuremberg-Regensburg railway line. The station was named Postbauer until 1978 but was renamed when the municipalities of Postbauer and Heng merged. The platforms have been refurbished in 1998 in anticipation of the Nuremberg S-Bahn line to Neumarkt, which will become operational in 2010.

The station lies within the area of the VGN transport association.

References

Railway stations in Bavaria
Railway stations in Germany opened in 1871
Nuremberg S-Bahn stations